Alfred Moss Holt (December 1866 – 1901) was an American football coach and academic. He served as the head football coach at New Mexico College of Agriculture and Mechanic Arts–now known as New Mexico State University–in 1894, compiling a record of 2–0. He graduate from New Mexico A&M in 1896 with a master's degree, making him the first graduate student in the history of the school.

Head coaching record

References

External links
 

1866 births
1901 deaths
New Mexico State University alumni
New Mexico State Aggies football coaches
Sportspeople from Arkansas